She Knows may refer to:

Music
 "She Knows" (J. Cole song)
 "She Knows" (Ne-Yo song)
 "She Knows", a 1986 song by Balaam and the Angel
 "She Knows", a 1989 song by The Barracudas
 "She Knows", a song by Suzi Quatro from Main Attraction

Online website
 SheKnows.com of SheKnows Media